Claire Nader (born July 18, 1928) is an American social scientist and a sister of Ralph, Laura, and Shafeek Nader.

Biography
She is a graduate of Smith College and holds a Ph.D. in political science, awarded by Columbia University, Department of Public Law and Government. Her dissertation was entitled "American Natural Scientists in the Policy Process: Three Atomic Energy Issues and Their Foreign Policy Implications".

In 1956, she became an instructor in the Department of Social Sciences at New York City Community College. Next she served as a Research Assistant for the Council for Atomic Age Studies from 1961 to 1963. During the 1960s she worked with Alvin Weinberg at Oak Ridge National Laboratory (ORNL), where she conducted civil defense research related to the potential societal aftereffects of a nuclear weapons attack. She was the first social scientist at ORNL, where she was director of Science in Society Studies in the Oak Ridge Institute of Nuclear Studies from 1963–1966. After leaving ORNL she extended her interests and became known in community activist issues relating to corporate and government policies as they affect local communities. 

She served as a chairman of the board of directors of the Council for Responsible Genetics from 1994–1996, is a trustee of Safety Systems, and was an editor for Sage Publications. 

Nader is the President of the Shafeek Nader Trust for the Community Interest which seeks to advance the ability of citizens to participate and shape the quality of democracy in their community.

Selected publications
 Claire Nader.  The Technical Expert in a Democracy, Bulletin of the Atomic Scientists, May 1966.
 Claire Nader (1968). "A Letter in Health Physics" in Health Physics, Printed in Northern Ireland, Pergamon Press. Vol. 14, pp. 379–381. 
 Claire Nader (1969). Technical Experts in Developing Countries, in Science and Technology in Developing Countries, eds. C. Nader and A. B. Zahlan. Cambridge University Press. 
 Claire Nader (1975). The Dispute Over Safe Uses of X-Rays in Medical Practice, in "Health Physics" Vol. 29, No.1, pp. 181–206. 
 Claire Nader (September 1975). "The Need and Desirability for Problem-Focused Research on The Interrelationships Between Science and Technology and Values and Ethics" April 29, 1975. Also AAAS Interdisciplinary Workshop on the Interrelationships Between Science and Technology and Ethics and Values. 
 Claire Nader (1976). "The Energy of Waste and the Problem of Informed Choices," in Energy and the Environment Cost-Benefit Analysis, R.A. Karam and K.Z. Morgan, eds. Energy – An International Jr. New York: Pergamon Press, pp. 625–629. 
 Claire Nader (1977). "Comment" in Toxic Substances and Trade Secrecy, Technical Information Project, Washington, D.C., pp. 63–66. 
 Claire Nader (June 1978). "Cultural Factors: Unresolved Issues in the Conflict Between Individual Freedom and Social Control" New York Academy of Sciences Conference on Public Control of Environmental Health Hazards.
 Claire Nader (1979). Controlling Environmental Health Hazards: Corporate Power, Individual Freedom and Social Control, Annals of New York Academy of Sciences, Volume 329, Public Control of Environmental Health Hazards. Pages 213–220, October 1979.
 Claire Nader and Laura Nader (1985). A Wide Angle on Regulation, in Regulatory Policy and the Social Sciences, R. Noll, ed. University of California Press, pp. 141–160. 
 Claire Nader (1986). Technology and Democratic Control: The Case of Recombinant DNA, in The Gene Splicing Wars. American Association for the Advancement of Science, eds., R.A. Zilinskas and B.K. Zimmerman, New York: Macmillan Publishing Company. 
 Claire Nader (February 1989). Changing the Way We Look at Science and Technology in Politics and The Life Sciences Vol. 7, No. 2.

References
 

Living people
Ralph Nader
1928 births
American women political scientists
American political scientists
American people of Lebanese descent
Place of birth missing (living people)
People from Winsted, Connecticut
People from Oak Ridge, Tennessee
Smith College alumni
Columbia Graduate School of Arts and Sciences alumni
Writers from Connecticut